Yardbird Suite is a composition by jazz saxophonist Charlie Parker

It may also refer to:
Yardbird Suite (Herbie Mann album), 1957
Yardbird Suite (Frank Morgan album), 1998
Yardbird Suite (jazz club), a jazz club located in Alberta, Canada